Morom may be,

Morom language
Morom commune, Cambodia